The Original Free Will Baptist Convention is a North Carolina-based body of Free Will Baptists that split from the National Association of Free Will Baptists in 1961.

The Original Free Will Baptist State Convention was established in 1913. In 1935 the State Convention became a charter member of the National Association. The North Carolina convention had developed along lines with slightly different polity from the midwestern and northern Free Will Baptists. They held to a more connectional form of government, and believed the annual conference could settle disputes in and discipline a local church. This view, different educational philosophies, and the desire of the North Carolina convention to operate its own press and Sunday School publishing created tensions that ended in division. The majority of Free Will Baptist churches in North Carolina withdrew from the National Association, while a minority withdrew from the State Convention to maintain affiliation with the National Association.

Headquarters of the State Convention are in Mount Olive, North Carolina. The Convention sponsors the Free Will Baptist Children's Home, Inc. in Middlesex, North Carolina (established 1920), the University of Mount Olive in Mount Olive, North Carolina (chartered 1951), and operates the Free Will Baptist Press in Ayden. It supports foreign missionaries in Bulgaria, India, Mexico, Nepal, Liberia, and the Philippines.

In 1991 they reported over 33,000 members in 236 churches that were organized into 7 conferences. Currently (2003) the Convention has grown to about 250 churches. Most of the churches are in eastern North Carolina.

Churches in OFWB Convention

External links
Free Will Baptist Children's Home, Inc.
Free Will Baptist Press Foundation, Inc.
University of Mount Olive
Original Free Will Baptist Convention
Original Free Will Baptist International Foreign Missions
 Liberia Mission
Little Rock Original Free Will Baptist Church
Micro Original Free Will Baptist Church
The Richard & Carolyn Hinnant Outreach Center - a ministry of Micro Original Free Will Baptist
Pleasant Grove Original Free Will Baptist Church-Pikeville

References
An Introduction to the Original Free Will Baptists, by Floyd B. Cherry
Baptists Around the World, by Albert W. Wardin, Jr.
Encyclopedia of Religion in the South, Samuel S. Hill, editor

Free Will Baptists
Christian organizations established in 1961
Baptist denominations in North America
Baptist denominations established in the 20th century
1961 establishments in North Carolina